David Andrew Welch (born 1960) is a Canadian political scientist. He is a university research chair and professor of political science at the Balsillie School of International Affairs of the University of Waterloo in Waterloo, Ontario, Canada.

Books 

 Justice and the Genesis of War, Cambridge University Press, 1993, .
 Painful Choices: A Theory of Foreign Policy Change, Princeton University Press, 2005, .
(with Joseph Nye)  Understanding Global Conflict and Cooperation: An Introduction to Theory and History, 10th ed. , Pearson Longman, 2016).

References 

Canadian international relations scholars
Academic staff of the University of Waterloo
University of Toronto alumni
Harvard University alumni
Canadian political scientists
Living people
1960 births